Flitch Green is a civil parish in the Uttlesford district of Essex, England. It consists of a housing development built outside the village of Little Dunmow. Flitch Green is on the site of an old sugar beet factory.

The development, originally named 'Oakwood Park', is next to the Flitch Way, a public right of way between Bishop's Stortford and Braintree where the old railway line used to run. The name 'Flitch' refers to the local Flitch of bacon custom. Building of Flitch Green began in 2001. The population (in December 2008) was 1,200, increasing to 2,190 at the 2011 Census.

Flitch Green was granted parish status in November 2008 in an order made by the district council; the order became effective on 1 April 2009. It had previously been in the parish of Little Dunmow.

Flitch Green Primary School, which serves the estate, was opened in September 2008. The primary school converted to The Flitch Green Academy in 2011.

References

External links 
 
Flitch Green Parish Council

Civil parishes in Essex
Villages in Essex
Uttlesford